Kathleen Bertko (born November 8, 1983) is an American Olympic rower. She won a total of four medals at the World Rowing Championships between 2009 and 2015.

References

External links

 Kathleen Bertko at USRowing
 
 

1983 births
Living people
American female rowers
People from Oakland, California
Rowers at the 2016 Summer Olympics
Olympic rowers of the United States
World Rowing Championships medalists for the United States
21st-century American women